Chiusavecchia is a comune (municipality) in the Province of Imperia in the Italian region Liguria, located about  southwest of Genoa and about  northwest of Imperia.

The municipality of Chiusavecchia contains the frazione (subdivision) Zebbi.

Chiusavecchia borders the following municipalities: Chiusanico, Lucinasco, and Pontedassio.

Demographic evolution

References

Cities and towns in Liguria